The 1994 Athens International was a men's tennis tournament played on outdoor clay courts in Athens, Greece that was part of the World Series of the 1994 ATP Tour. It was the ninth and last edition of the tournament and was held from 3 October until 10 October 1994. First-seeded Alberto Berasategui won the singles title.

Finals

Singles

 Alberto Berasategui defeated  Oscar Martinez 4–6, 7–6(7–4), 6–3
 It was Berasategui's 5th title of the year and the 6th of his career.

Doubles

 Luis Lobo /  Javier Sánchez defeated  Cristian Brandi /  Federico Mordegan 5–7, 6–1, 6–4
 It was Lobo's only title of the year and the 1st of his career. It was Sánchez's 2nd title of the year and the 20th of his career.

References

External links
 ITF tournament edition details 

Athens International
ATP Athens Open
Athens International
October 1994 sports events in Europe